Makaan.com is an online real estate portal in India, launched in 2007. It has a rating system for brokers.

History
Makaan.com was a part of Anupam Mittal-promoted People Group. The group owned other businesses like Shaadi.com and Mauj.

Promoters
In April 2015, Proptiger.com, an independent online real estate advisor, took over Makaan.com. The move looks to enhance the services provided by makaan.com is now a part of Elara Technologies PVT Limited, Singapore which is also the company that owns Proptiger.com. Elara Technologies PVT Limited is a digital real estate marketing and transaction service provider. SAIF Partners, Accel Partners, and Horizons Ventures are some of the major investors of Elara. Rupert Murdoch's News Corp, a global media, book publishing, and digital real estate services company took a 25% stake in Elara in November 2014.

References

External links
 

 Companies based in Noida
 Indian real estate websites
Indian companies established in 2007
2007 establishments in Haryana